Erdene Chuluun (born 5 October 1971 in Ulaanbataar) is a minimumweight Mongolian boxer who turned pro in 1997.

Professional boxing record

References

1971 births
Living people
Mongolian male boxers
Mini-flyweight boxers
20th-century Mongolian people